Bie or BIE may refer to:

 Bie, Sweden, a village in Södermanland County
 Bié Plateau, a highland region in Angola
 Bié Province in Angola
 Beijing Institute of Education, a university in China
 Bureau International des Expositions, the intergovernmental organisation that supervises international exhibitions
 Bienheuré (Saint Bié), a semi-legendary saint of Vendôme
 Bureau of Indian Education, a bureau within the US government
 Black Identity Extremists, a designation coined by the FBI
 Trionychidae, (鳖) a type of turtle known as "bie" in China

People with the surname Bie
 Amadeus de Bie, General Abbot
 Ferdinand Bie, co-champion of the pentathlon at the 1912 Summer Olympics in Stockholm